'Pé-de-Moleque' (literally "brat's foot" in Portuguese) is a traditional candy from Brazil. It is made of peanuts and rapadura or molasses. 
The candy is prepared by mixing roasted, peeled peanuts with melted brown sugar,  with or without the addition of macerated peanuts as well. The mixture is gently stirred over low heat until it gets close to crystallizing. Then the mixture is placed on a plain stone or metal surface (preferably thinly oiled with butter to ease removal) in pieces similar in size to cookies. This traditional preparation results in soft, irregularly-shaped sweets of a dark brown color. Softness results from the incorporation of peanut oil.

Pé-de-Moleque appeared in the middle of the 16th century, with the arrival of sugar cane in Brazil. The city of Piranguinho, in the south of the state of Minas Gerais, is known for the artisanal production of sweets, and has stood out on the national scene through the party of the biggest pé-de-moleque in the world, which is part of the municipality's cultural calendar of festivities.

In India, mainly in the states of Gujarat and Maharashtra, they call it chikki. In Portugal, the pé-de-moleque is known as nougat. In Mexico, it's called palanqueta.

There is a derivation of the candy in the version of a cake, common to festa juninas from places in Brazilian Northeast. Pé-de-moleque cake is also called "bolo preto" (black cake), in which cashew can replace peanuts, rapadura is kept and fermented cassava mass (pubada, puba mass) and other ingredients.

Etymology
The name "pé-de-moleque" has two hypotheses for its origin: 
 reference to the paving of irregular stones found in historic Brazilian cities such as Paraty and Ouro Preto, which was so named.
 motivated by the street vendors of the past who sold them and were robbed by the kids. In order not to be harassed anymore, they told the boys to ask, because they didn't need to steal:
 - Pede, moleque! (ask for it, kid!)

In the literature
The sweet can still be found in the literature, such as in O dialeto caipira,  by Amadeu Amaral, there is reference to the  "pé-de-moleque" .

In 1983, Carlos Drummond de Andrade referred to the pé-de-moleque as being the "pure jewel of Minas Gerais". The text was sent to one of Piranguinho's bakers.

References

Brazilian confectionery
Nut confections
Peanut dishes